Simonswood Supply Depot was one of the main ammunition depots in Lancashire, England during World War II. Located at Simonswood, it was used as an ammunition depot delivered by ROF Kirkby. The remains of the ammunition bunkers still exist today.

References
 Second World War Defences
 Northwest Exploration Forum
 Second World War Defences – Simonswood Munitions Storage

Royal Ordnance Factories in England
Buildings and structures in the Borough of West Lancashire